Ross Matiscik (born September 13, 1996) is an American football long snapper for the Jacksonville Jaguars of the National Football League (NFL). He played college football at Baylor.

Early life and high school
Matiscik was born in Youngstown, Ohio.  He grew up in McKinney, Texas and attended McKinney Boyd High School, where he played baseball and football. As a three-year letter winner, Matiscik played offensive line and linebacker, especially excelling as a middle linebacker. As a senior, Matiscik was named an all-state linebacker and District 6-6A's Defensive MVP, completing his career with 233 tackles, 12 sacks, 4 interceptions, and a blocked field goal. Despite this, he was not recruited by any division one teams coming out of high school.

College career
Matiscik was a member of the Baylor Bears for five seasons, redshirting as a true freshman and joining the team as a walk-on. During his redshirt year, he was moved to the long snapper position. While he was Baylor's primary long snapper for four seasons, Matiscik also served as a reserve linebacker for the Bears.

Professional career

Jacksonville Jaguars
Matiscik was signed by the Jacksonville Jaguars as an undrafted free agent on April 26, 2020. He made the 53-man roster out of training camp, beating out incumbent long snapper Matthew Orzech. Matiscik made his NFL debut on September 13, 2020 in the season opener against the Indianapolis Colts.

On April 29, 2022, Matiscik signed a five-year, $5.965 million contract extension with the Jaguars through the 2026 season.

References

External links
 Baylor Bears bio
 Jacksonville Jaguars bio

1996 births
Living people
American football long snappers
Baylor Bears football players
Jacksonville Jaguars players
People from McKinney, Texas
Players of American football from Texas
Sportspeople from the Dallas–Fort Worth metroplex